Loxocrambus coloradellus is a moth in the family Crambidae. It was described by Charles H. Fernald in 1893. It is found in North America, where it has been recorded from California and Colorado.

The wingspan is 17–22 mm. Adults have been recorded on wing in May and July.

References

Crambini
Moths described in 1893
Moths of North America